"Beautiful Target" is a song released by the South Korean boy band B1A4. The song is the lead single from the group's second mini album It B1A4, released on September 16, 2011. The song was re-recorded in Japanese and used as the group's debut single in Japan, released on June 27, 2012.

Composition
The song was composed by the members CNU and Baro and composed by 우리형과 내동생. In the mini album It B1A4, the song is listed as the track 1.

Promotions
The group started promoting the song on September 16, 2011, on KBS' Music Bank. It was also promoted on the shows Show! Music Core, Inkigayo, M! Countdown and MTV The Show. The promotions of the song ended in November 2011 on SBS' Inkigayo and followed by the song "My Love". The song "Chu Chu Chu", from It B1A4, was used as an intro for the comeback week performances.

Music video
A teaser of the music video was released on September 9, 2011. The full video was released one week after, on September 16, 2011, along with the EP digital release. Another version of the music video, called "Zoom Zoom" version, was released on October 7, 2011.

Chart performance
The song debuted at the position number 86 in Gaon's Weekly singles chart, on the week of September 25, with 4,030,414 points. On the following week the song climbed nineteen positions and charted at number 67, which is the current peak of the song.

Charts

Japanese version

Almost one year after its original release, the group's agency, WM Entertainment announced that the song was re-recorded in Japanese and will be used as their debut single in Japan. The single was released on June 27, 2012, in three different editions: CD+DVD, CD+Goods and a Regular edition.

Composition
The song was translated in Japanese by Shoko Fujibayashi. The b-side "Chu Chu Chu" was originally written by Song Bong-jo and Song Jae-won and translated in Japanese by MEG.ME.  The song "Bling Girl", included as a bonus track of the CD+Goods edition, was originally written by the members Jinyoung and Baro and translated in Japanese by MEG.ME. The song is originally in Korean and it was released on their debut EP Let's Fly. The song "Ready to Go", included as a bonus track of the Regular edition, is an original Japanese song written by Yuki Shirai.

Music video
The music video of the Japanese version of the song was released on June 3, 2012, in Pony Canyon's YouTube account. Although this version has different studios and looks, the music video follows the same concept of the Korean version.

Track listing

Charts

Oricon chart

Other charts

Release history

References

External links
 
 
 

2011 singles
2012 debut singles
Korean-language songs
Japanese-language songs
2011 songs
South Korean songs